Janek (Jan) Rubeš (born December 24th, 1987) is a Czech reporter, documentarist, vlogger and director. He is mainly known for the YouTube channel Honest Guide, which he runs with his friend and cameraman Honza Mikulka. The channel provides tips for tourists, including tips on how to avoid tourist traps and scams in many cities, mainly Prague.

In 2016 the Czech edition of Forbes featured Rubeš in their 30 under 30 list: 30 of the most talented Czechs under 30 years old. The British newspaper The Independent named him and Honza Mikulka "the patron saints of Prague tourism".

Early life 
Rubeš studied at The Film Academy of Miroslav Ondricek in Písek and also at Tomáš Baťa University in Zlín. His father, Jan Rubeš, is known for his work in television production. His parents are divorced.

Career 
In 2006, Rubeš filmed viral videos as part of a duo called Noisebrothers with Jindra Malík. Since 2006, he has been engaged with Czech internet television Stream.cz, for which he has created a number of successful programs over the years, including How to Do It, NBN, Life in Luxury, City of Scams?, or Prague vs. Crooks. In Prague vs. Crooks (2015), he documented Prague as a city of organized crime. For example, he captured taxi drivers scamming tourists – charging them many times the normal price. He was also a cameraman for a series about architecture Gebrian versus or Jídlo s.r.o.

In 2018, he left Stream.cz and joined the newly emerging Czech news channel Seznam Zprávy, which is under ownership of the Czech internet portal and company Seznam.cz. Between 2018 and 2019, he hosted the talkshow V Centru (translated as In The Centre) which he was the author of.

Honest Guide 
Since 2016, he has published his most popular series Honest Guide with his cameraman friend Honza Mikulka on YouTube. It is filmed mainly in English and sometimes in Czech. The channel provides tips for tourists, including tips on how to avoid tourist traps and scams in many cities, mainly Prague. They have also filmed in multiple cities in the Czech Republic (such as Český Krumlov, Pardubice, and Brno) and abroad (New York, Kyiv, Tampere, and Innsbruck).

The YouTube channel has currently, as of February 2023, amassed more than 1 Million subscribers and more than 117.8 million views. Many of the videos from the Honest Guide channel were deleted in March 2021 due to a copyright dispute. Janek Rubeš and Honza Mikulka were employed by TV Seznam until the end of 2020 and they shot the same videos from the Honest Guide for their employer. The videos for TV Seznam were in Czech, but the content was the same. On 2 October 2020 Janek Rubeš and Honza Mikulka founded their new Czech youtube channel Kluci z Prahy.

References

External links 

Rubeš articles at seznamzpravy.cz

1987 births
Journalists from Prague
Living people
Czech YouTubers
Tourism in Prague
Tour guides